Elections to Chichester District Council in West Sussex, United Kingdom are scheduled to be held on 4 May 2023. The election will take place on the same day as other local elections in England as part of the 2023 United Kingdom local elections. The whole council will be up for election, having been under no overall control since the resignation of two councillors from the Conservative group in September 2020.

Background 
The result at the last election and the current composition of the Council is given below:

References 

2023 English local elections
May 2023 events in the United Kingdom
2023
2020s in West Sussex